Weird Tales is a pulp magazine.

Weird Tales may also refer to:
 Weird Tales (album), an album by Golden Smog
 Weird Tales (anthology series), a series of paperback anthologies, a revival of the classic magazine of the same title
 Weird Tales (film), a 1994 Italian film
 Captain America's Weird Tales, a short-lived golden age comic series

See also
 Weird fiction, a literary genre